NGC 307 is a lenticular galaxy in the constellation Cetus. It was discovered on September 6, 1831 by John Herschel.

References

External links
 

0307
18310906
Cetus (constellation)
Lenticular galaxies
003367